"Quédate" is a song by Colombian-American latin pop singer-songwriter Soraya. The song was released as the second single from her bilingual debut studio album En Esta Noche / On Nights Like This (1996). The song was written, produced and recorded by Soraya. Peter Van Hooke and Rod Argent. An English-language version called "Stay Awhile" was released on the English/international edition of the album On Nights Like This.

Track listing

References

1996 singles
Soraya (musician) songs
Songs written by Soraya (musician)
1996 songs
Island Records singles
Song recordings produced by Rod Argent